Toeachizown is the first solo studio album by American neo-boogie musician Dâm-Funk, released on October 27, 2009 by Stones Throw Records. Album was produced by Leon Sylvers III, a record producer of SOLAR Records and a member of 70s disco group The Sylvers. The album is influenced by 1980s funk, post-disco, electro, boogie, P-funk, sci-fi music of the 1970s and the 1980s and other eighties-influenced music. The album was generally well received by critics.

Reception

The Allmusic (4/5) review by Andy Kellman awarded the album 4 stars stating "what also sets Dâm apart from his contemporaries is a total reliance on, and mastery of, old gear; that's how some of these tracks swing like the best of Mtume's '80s albums while bouncing, kicking, and squirming like Zapp and early Prince."
The Pitchfork Media (8.2/10) review by Nate Patrin states that "Toeachizown is a deep, astute collection that feels like a natural resuscitation and progression of funk as it stood just before hip hop usurped it."
The Guardian (unrated) review by Alex Macpherson states that "Though DâM-FunK's brilliant debut album, Toeachizown, is unmistakably funk in lineage, it somehow sounds unlike anything else."

Track listing
All songs written by Damon G. Riddick.
Part I

Part II

Release history

References

2009 albums
Dâm-Funk albums